Ceriops decandra is a mangrove plant of tropical Asia in the family Rhizophoraceae. The specific epithet  is from the Greek meaning "ten male", referring to the flower having ten stamens.

Description
Its bark is pale brown. The flowers are white.

Distribution and habitat
Ceriops decandra grows naturally in India and Bangladesh (including the Sundarbans), Burma, Thailand and Peninsular Malaysia. Its habitat is mangrove swamps and tidal creeks.

References

External links

Rhizophoraceae
Mangroves
Flora of India (region)
Flora of Bangladesh
Flora of Myanmar
Flora of Thailand
Flora of Peninsular Malaysia
Plants described in 1836